Connagnostus is an extinct genus from a well-known class of fossil marine arthropods, the trilobites. It lived from 501 to 490 million years ago during the Dresbachian faunal stage of the late Cambrian Period.

References

Agnostidae
Fossils of Canada
Cambrian trilobites
Fossils of China
Fossils of Kazakhstan
Fossils of Russia
Paleozoic life of Newfoundland and Labrador
Paleozoic life of Yukon